Fred Armstrong is a retired American professional soccer goalkeeper.

Armstrong played for the St. Petersburg Kickers in 1977.  At the time, he had entered Florida Tech in order to play collegiate soccer.  However, the NCAA denied his request as he had previously signed an amateur contract with the Tampa Bay Rowdies of the North American Soccer League.  In 1981, he played for the Cleveland Cobras of the American Soccer League.  In 1982, he played for the Nashville Diamonds.  He currently coaches with the Thunder Soccer Club in Columbus, Ohio.

References

American soccer coaches
American soccer players
Florida Institute of Technology alumni
American Soccer League (1933–1983) players
Cleveland Cobras players
Nashville Diamonds players
St. Petersburg Kickers players
Living people
Association football goalkeepers
Year of birth missing (living people)